The Department of Adi Dravidar and Tribal Welfare (Tamil Nadu) is a state government ministry in Tamil Nadu.

Sub - Departments

Undertakings & Bodies

Present Ministers (2011-2016) 
 S. Damodaran - Minister for Agriculture

Former Ministers 
 Veerapandy S. Arumugam (2006-2011)

See also 
 Government of Tamil Nadu
 Tamil Nadu Government's Departments
 Ministry of Agriculture (India)
 Department of Finance (Kerala)

References
 http://www.tn.gov.in/departments/agri.html (Official Website of the Agriculture Department, Tamil Nadu)
 http://www.tn.gov.in (Official website of Government of Tamil Nadu)

Government of Tamil Nadu
Agriculture in India